Dominique Bourgoing (died 1589) was a French physician in the household of Mary, Queen of Scots. He is notable as the author of an influential account of Mary's captivity and execution.

Doctor in the household

Bourgoing trained in Paris. He defended theses on subjects including pulmonary health and poisoning.  He was recorded in many letters and administrative documents as a member of Mary's household in England from 1580, as a replacement for Jacques de Lugerie. Mary also had surgeons and apothecaries including Jacques Gervais and Pierre Gorion. Bourgoing sent updates on Mary's health to Michel de Castelnau, the French ambassador in London.

Mary was arrested on 11 August 1586 while out riding and hunting with a crossbow near Chartley Castle with her secretaries Gilbert Curle and Claude Nau, Bastian Pagez, Bourgoing and others. They were surprised by armed soldiers who took them to Tixall.

According to some accounts of Mary's death, Bourgoing persuaded Mary drink some wine and eat a bit of bread before her execution.

Medical materials
After Mary's execution, an inventory was made of her possessions. Bourgoing had several medical items in his keeping, including a little gold bottle containing a stone (a bezoar stone) used as a medicine for colic, and a silver bottle with a stone used a remedy for poison. A ring with a sapphire and an enamel ring were also counted as jewels of Mary, Queen of Scots. Precious objects for medicinal purposes were usually kept in Mary's cabinet room, including the bezoar stone, an oval charm against melancholy, and sachets of powdered coral, pearl, and terre sigillée (a medicinal clay). The clay and a piece of supposed unicorn horn, an antidote against poison, were sent from France by Mary's ally, the Archbishop of Glasgow.

Writing about Mary
Bourgoing's journal of Mary's last days commences on 11 August 1586. A manuscript was published by Régis Chantelauze (1821-1888) in 1876.

 Regis Chantelauze, Marie Stuart : son proces et son execution, d'apres le journal inedit de Bourgoing son medecin (Paris, 1876), pp. 466-578

English versions of the journal were published by Mary Monica Maxwell-Scott and Samuel Cowan.

Bourgoing's account of the death of Mary was used by the contemporary author Adam Blackwood in La mort de la royne d'Escosse, douairiere de France (1588) and other works. According to Blackwood, Mary asked Bourgoing to take her heart to France.

The journal includes a number of names and placenames, some not recorded elsewhere in connection with Mary's itinerary. It reveals that she stayed at an inn in Leicester called the Angel.

References

Court of Mary, Queen of Scots
16th-century French writers
16th-century French physicians
1589 deaths